"Next Boyfriend" is a song by American country music singer Lauren Alaina. It is the first single from her 2015 self-titled EP and her second studio album, Road Less Traveled.

Critical reception
According to Jen Swirsky from Nashville Gab, "The song can aptly be described as flirtatiously sexy, while still remaining age appropriate and youth friendly for Lauren's wide array of fans. With a comparatively explosive chorus that demonstrates Lauren's broad vocal range, the quick-witted girl with adorable stage presence and endless humorous quips explains to the man who has caught her attention why he should head her way." One Stop Country states, "This song allows Alaina the chance to re-introduce herself, while also showing her growth and maturity as an artist and songwriter, but she smartly still maintains her youthful sound and age-appropriate lyrics."

Track listing
Digital download
"Next Boyfriend" – 3:11

Music video
The music video was directed by TK McKamy and premiered in January 2016.

Chart performance
The song debuted on the Hot Country Songs chart at No. 39, with 10,000 copies sold in its first week of release.

Release history

References

2015 songs
2015 singles
Lauren Alaina songs
Mercury Nashville singles
19 Recordings singles
Music videos directed by TK McKamy
Song recordings produced by busbee
Songs written by Emily Weisband
Songs written by Lauren Alaina